It's Alive is the sixth album by The Ozark Mountain Daredevils and is a 2-record set recorded live in concert through Missouri and Kansas with the Enactron truck in April 1978. It contains their hits and well known album cuts. 
It is their final A&M Records release before moving to Columbia Records.

Track listing

Charts

Personnel
Steve Cash - harmonica, percussion, vocals
John Dillon - guitar, fiddle, piano, mouthbow, vocals
Larry Lee - drums, piano, guitar, vocals
Steve Canaday - guitar, drums, bass
Michael "Supe de jour" Granda - bass, guitar, vocals
Buddy Brayfield - keyboards, vocals
Rune Walle - guitar, banjo
Jerry Mills - mandolin
Ruell Chappell - keyboard

Production
Produced by The Ozark Mountain Daredevils
Remixed at Sunset Sound Recorders, Hollywood, California
Engineered by Marty Lewis
Assisted by Stuart Taylor and Raffaello Mazza
Concert Sounds by Carlo Sound, Nashville, Tenn.
Thanks to John Logan and Dennis Fite
Lights by Cowtown Lights
Equipment faithfully attended to by Larry Tucker and Steve Fisk
Road Manager: Charlie McCall
Art Direction: Roland Young
Design: Junie Osaki
Photography: Jim Mayfield

References

The Ozark Mountain Daredevils albums
1978 live albums
A&M Records live albums